This article lists distributors of manga in various markets worldwide.

Chinese

Traditional Chinese
Daran Comics (defunct) (Taiwan) 
Kadokawa Comics Taiwan (Taiwan)
Tong Li Comics (Taiwan)
Ever Glory Publishing (Taiwan) 
Sharp Point Publishing (Taiwan)
King Comics Hong Kong (Hong Kong)
Culturecom Comics (Hong Kong) 
Jade Dynasty (Hong Kong)
Jonesky (Hong Kong)
Kwong's Creations Co Ltd
Rightman Publishing Ltd

Simplified Chinese
ChuangYi Publishing (Singapore) 
WitiComics (Hong Kong)

Czech
CREW

Dutch
 Glenat 
 Kana 
 Xtra

English
ADV Manga (defunct)
Aurora Publishing (defunct) 
Blast Books
Broccoli Books (defunct)
Chuang Yi (defunct)
CMX (defunct)
ComicsOne (defunct)
CPM Manga (defunct)
Cross Infinite World
Dark Horse Comics
Del Rey Manga (defunct)
Denpa
DH Publishing
Digital Manga
DramaQueen
Drawn & Quarterly
DrMaster
eigoMANGA
Go! Comi
J-Novel Club
Kaiten Books
Kodansha Comics
Madman Entertainment
Netcomics 
One Peace Books
Ponent Mon/Fanfare
Seven Seas Entertainment
Sol Press (defunct)
Square Enix Manga & Books
Studio Ironcat (defunct)
Titan Publishing Group
Tokyopop (formerly Mixx)
Udon Entertainment
Vertical
Viz Media (formerly Viz, LLC)
Yen Press

Finnish
Sangatsu Manga
Egmont Finland
Punainen jättiläinen
Pauna Media Group
Editorial Ivrea

French
Ankama Editions
Akata/Delcourt
Asuka
Atomic Club (defunct)
Casterman
Doki Doki
Dybex (retired from the manga market in 2006) (Belgium)
Gekko
Panini Manga (part of Panini Comics)
Glénat
J'ai lu (retired from the manga market in 2006)
Kami
Kana
Kaze 
Kabuto
Ki-oon
Kurokawa
Pika Édition
SeeBD (defunct)
Shogun City
Tonkam
Végétal Manga Shoten became Vegetal Shuppan in 2006

German
Carlsen Verlag
Delfinium Prints
Egmont Manga & Anime (EMA)
Planet Manga
Tokyopop Germany
Heyne Manga
Butter & Cream
Schwarzer Turm
Kazé Manga

Hungarian
Mangafan
Mangattack
Fumax

Indonesian
Elex Media Komputindo
Level Comics (imprint of Elex Media Komputindo)
M&C Comics
Tiga Lancar Comic

Italian
BAO Publishing
Canicola Edizioni
Coconino Press
d/books (part of d/visual, defunct)
DisneyManga
Dynit
Flashbook
Free Books
GP Manga (formerly GP Publishing, acquired by Edizioni BD and merged with J-Pop)
Granata Press (defunct)
Goen (part of RW Edizioni)
J-Pop (part of Edizioni BD)
Hazard Edizioni
Hikari Edizioni (part of 001 Edizioni)
Kappa Edizioni
Magic Press
PlayPress (now Play Media Company, retired from the manga market in 2008)
Planet Manga (part of Panini Comics)
Planeta DeAgostini (retired from the manga market in 2009)
Oblomov Edizioni
Rizzoli Lizard
Ronin Manga
Star Comics
Yamato Edizioni (part of Yamato Video)

Japanese
Akita Publishing Co., Ltd.
 Bungeishunjū
Chuokoron Shinsha
Enterbrain
Fujimi Shobo
Fusosha
Futabasha
Gakken
Gentosha
Hakusensha
Hayakawa Publishing
Ichijinsha
Kadokawa Shoten
Kobunsha
Kodansha
Mag Garden
MediaWorks
MediBang Inc.
Shinchosha
Shinshokan
Shodensha
Shogakukan
Shonen Gahosha
Shueisha
Square Enix
Tokuma Shoten
 Tokodo
 Ushio Shuppan
Wani Books

Malay
Art Square Group
Comics House (Closed)
Tora Aman (Closed)
Superior Comics
Komik Remaja
Arena
Umbra
PCM comics
Manga Boom

Polish
Japonica Polonica Fantastica
Waneko
Ringo Ame
Studio JG
Kotori
Yumegari
Taiga
Hanami
Dango

Portuguese

European Portuguese
Editora Devir
Sendai Editora
Midori Editora

Brazilian Portuguese
JBC
Planet Manga
NewPOP Editora

Russian
Comix ART (part of Eksmo)

Spanish
Editorial Vid México
Editorial Toukan (Mexico)
Glénat
Ivréa
Norma Editorial
Planeta DeAgostini
Ediciones Mangaline

Swedish
Bonnier Carlsen
Egmont Kärnan
Ordbilder Media

Thai
Phoenix Next(Kadokawa Amarin)
Vibulkij Comics
Nida Publishing
Nation Edutainment
Comics Publications Co., Ltd.
Bongkoch
Siam Inter Comics
luckpim publishing
First Page Pro
ANIMAG Comics
Dexpress
Zenshu Comics (Rose Media and Entertainment)

Vietnamese
Tre Publishing House
Kim Đồng Publishing House
TVM Comics (Closed)
TA Books
Innovative Publishing and Media (IPM)

References 

 
Manga distributors